Undermine or Undermining can refer to:

 The military practice of mining a fortification
 UnderMine, a roguelike indie video game
 Undermine (Transformers), a Transformers character
 Undermine (Warcraft), a fictional location in Warcraft
 Undermining (chess), a chess tactic in which a defensive piece is captured
 Social undermining, the opposite of social support
 A song from the American television series Nashville

See also
 Undermind (album), by American rock band Phish
 Undermind (TV series)
 Underminded, an American hardcore punk band
 Underminer, a character from The Incredibles